Omsk State Technical University (OmSTU) in Omsk, Russia, is an educational institution in the Western Siberian Region. Omsk State Technical University (OmSTU) was established in 1942.

Bachelor courses

 Mechanical Engineering
 Design-Technological Support
 Machine-Building Manufacturing
 Materials Science And Technology Of Materials
 Technological Machines And Equipment
 Refrigerating, Cryogenic Engineering And Life Support Systems
 Chemical Technology
 Energy And Resource-Saving Processes In Chemical Technology, Petrochemicals And Biotechnology
 Biotechnology
 Technospheric Safety
 Oil And Gas Business
  Technology Of Polygraphic And Packaging Production
 Heatenergy And Heat Engineering
 Electro-Power Engineering And Electrical Engineering
 Fundamental Informatics And Information Technologies
 Mathematical Security And Administration Of Information Systems
 Computer Science And Computer Engineering
 Applied Informatics
 Program Engineering
 Automation Of Technological Processes And Production
 System Analysis And Management
 Management In Technical Systems
 Information Security
 Radio Engineering
 Infocommunication Technologies And Communication Systems
 Design And Technology Of Electronic Means
 Electronics And Nanoelectronics
 Instrumentation
 Nanoin Engineering
 Building
 Power Engineering Engineering
 Applied Mechanics
 Operation Of Transportation And Technological Machines And Complexes
 Missile Complexes And Cosmonautics
 Standardization And Metrology
 Information Systems And Technologies
 State And Municipal Management
 Social Work
 Advertising And Communication With The Public
 Design
 Economy
 Management
 Human Resources Management
 Product Technology And Public Catering
 Technology Of Equipment Of Light Industry
 Design Of Equipment Of Light Industry
 Trading Business
 Equipment
 Service
 Tourism
 Hotel Business

Master courses

 Fundamental Computer Science and Information technologies
 Computer Science and Engineering
 Information Systems and Technology
 Applied Informatics
 Radio engineering
 Information and Communication Technologies and Communication Systems
 Design and technology of electronic means
 Electronics and Nanoelectronics
 Instrumentation
 Heat power and heat engineering
 Power and Electrical Engineering
 Power machinery
 Engineering
 Technological machines and equipment
 Applied mechanics
 Automation of technological processes and production
 Design and technological support of machine-building production
 Refrigerating, cryogenic equipment and life support systems
 Chemical Technology
 Energy and resource saving processes in chemical engineering, petrochemical and biotechnology
 Biotechnology
 Technosphere safety
 Oil and gas business
 Materials science and technology of materials
 Operation of transport and technological machines and systems
 Missile Systems and Astronautics
 Standardization and Metrology
 Nanoengineering
 The technology of printing and packaging production
 Economy
 State and municipal management
 Design

PhD Courses

 Mathematics and Mechanics
 Physics and Astronomy
 Chemical sciences
 Earth sciences
 Computer Science and Engineering
 Electronics, radio engineering and communication systems
 Photonics, instrumentation, optical and biotechnical systems and technologies
 Elektro- and combined heat and power
 Nuclear Energy and Technology
 Machinery
 Physics and engineering science and technology
 Сhemical
 Materials Technology
 Aviation, rocket and space technology
 Management in technical systems
 Economy
 Social sciences
 Linguistics and Literature
 Historical sciences and archeology
 Philosophy, Ethics and Religion
 Physical culture and sport
 Cultural

References

External links
  
  

Omsk
Universities and institutes established in the Soviet Union
Universities in Omsk Oblast
Educational institutions established in 1942
Engineering universities and colleges in Russia
1942 establishments in the Soviet Union